Rafi Cohen (born 21 August 1974) is an Israeli former footballer.

Honours
Israeli Premier League (2):
2000–01, 2001–02
Toto Cup (1):
2002–03
Israel State Cup (1):
2004
Liga Alef - Northern Division (1):
2007–08

References

External links
Profile at One

1974 births
Living people
Israeli Jews
Israeli footballers
Hapoel Karmiel F.C. players
Hapoel Rishon LeZion F.C. players
Maccabi Haifa F.C. players
Bnei Sakhnin F.C. players
Hapoel Acre F.C. players
Sektzia Ness Ziona F.C. players
Hapoel Bnei Tamra F.C. players
Hapoel Umm al-Fahm F.C. players
Ahva Arraba F.C. players
Hapoel Asi Gilboa F.C. players
Liga Leumit players
Israeli Premier League players
Footballers from Tirat Carmel
Association football forwards